The Other Half of the Sky: A China Memoir is a 1975 American documentary film directed by Shirley MacLaine and Claudia Weill. It was nominated for an Academy Award for Best Documentary Feature.

References

External links

 The autobiography "Berkeley to Beijing" discusses the events surrounding the filming from a twelve-year-old girls perspective.

1975 films
1975 documentary films
American documentary films
Films directed by Shirley MacLaine
Films directed by Claudia Weill
Documentary films about China
1970s English-language films
1970s American films